Anthony Melas, better known by his stage name A!MS (pronounced "aims") or his previous stage name A.M. SNiPER, is an English-Cypriot rapper, record producer, and entrepreneur.

Career

Music
A!MS made his debut as a member of So Solid Crew before launching his solo career. In 2018, he was nominated for the "Man of the Year" award by Cyprus' MAD magazine for his contribution to the island's music scene and the culture of Ayia Napa. He has collaborated with and produced for artists such as Cool & Dre, The Game, Oxide & Neutrino, and Wiley.

In 2020, shortly after the release of his single "Diablo", A!MS showcased part of his Ayia Napa home in an episode of Cribs, a Trace+ streaming series based on the MTV series of the same name. He was also featured in the car culture magazine Fast Car, in which he exhibited part of his collection of sports cars. In 2021, he released the single "Honor" featuring Projexx, Julian Marley, and AV Allure, which was co-produced by Cool & Dre.

Business
A!MS is one of the heads of the strategic and business development department of the Ayia Napa water park WaterWorld, which has been owned by his family since he was a child. He oversaw the water park's event The Wave, a series of parties nominated for the 2020 InBusiness Awards. The water park holds over 30 international awards and accolades from publications such as Tripadvisor.

A!MS is the founder and CEO of the record label 3fifty7 Music. He is also the owner of the marketing firm La Familia Marketing.

Personal life
A!MS splits his time between Ayia Napa and London.

Discography
 2011: 11 (EP)
 2015: SNiPER SKiLLS MIXTAPE (with Jaguar Skills)

References

External links 
 Official website
 A!MS on Instagram
 A!MS on Facebook

English hip hop musicians
English male rappers
English record producers
English people of Cypriot descent
Year of birth missing (living people)
Place of birth missing (living people)
Living people
So Solid Crew members